The Jagdkommando is the Austrian Armed Forces' special forces unit. The unit is based at Wiener Neustadt.

The unit is known to have a manpower of 400 operators.

History
The name "Jagdkommando" has its origins in the time of World War I, when small assault squads of the Austrian K.u.K. Army were called what translates to "manhunt command".

The history of the Austrian Special Operations Forces begins in 1961, when a group of Austrian officers participated in the US Army's Ranger School as part of their training in order to set up a similar course for the eventual establishment of Jagdkommando. Jagdkommando training courses were set up on May 4, 1963 to train the first operators.

Most of the missions are classified, but the Jagdkommando usually operates in places where regular Austrian troops are also located - such as the Balkans (KFOR, etc.), Afghanistan (ISAF/Resolute Support), and Chad (EUFOR Tchad/RCA). In the eastern area of Chad, about 50 Jagdkommando soldiers were deployed to protect refugee camps near the border to Darfur from early 2008 to 2009.

As of 2012, it was reported that Jagdkommando selected a female Austrian soldier to serve in the unit.

In 2016, the Jagdkommando deployed to Mali alongside French Special Forces as part of Operation Barkhane.

In 2018, it was reported that Jagdkommando operators were in Burkina Faso to train Burkinabean troops.

On November 3, 2022, Jagdkommando has adopted Multicam Arid as their official camouflage uniform.

Structure
The unit is structured according to the following:

Headquarters
1st Special Operations Task Group (Has fewer than 100 operators under a major)
2nd Special Operations Task Group (Has fewer than 100 operators under a major)
3rd Special Operations Task Group (Reserve)

Roles
Jagdkommando is known to operate under the following roles:

 Reconnaissance
 Commando operations (includes amphibious operations)
 Counter-terrorist operations
 SAR operations
 Military training with soldiers from partner/friendly countries
 Military aid to the civil power
 Non-combatant evacuation operations

The unit was formerly in charge of VIP protection, but the responsibility was handed to Austrian Military Police units.

Training

Selection is usually held once a year and has a duration of 6 months. The program normally begins in January with 3 weeks (21 days) of pre-selection. During this time the candidate will take the physical tests required, receive additional training, and undergo a 72-hour (3-day) Field Exercise, which is the core event of the selection process.

Most candidates will fail during the 72-hour (3-day) exercise, which includes long road marches in squad size elements, psychological test batteries, and total sleep deprivation. The pre-selection course is conducted both by active operators and by enablers of the unit.

Normally, 20-25% of all candidates will pass the pre selection course and continue with the so-called Jagdkommandogrundkurs, the basic course of selection. The first few weeks are held in the remote area of Allentsteig, a giant military training area in close proximity to the Czech border. The first seven weeks of small unit tactics are overshadowed with plenty of snow, freezing weather, very small amounts of sleep, and continuous physical performance. Candidates get used to a heavy Lowe Rucksack and spend most of their day with it on their backs while conducting patrols, ambushes, and raids in the forests around Allentsteig.

After the small unit tactics phase, which eliminates the last few unfitting candidates, the basic course continues with block courses of two or three weeks each:

Basic Demolition Course
Airborne Course
Amphibious Insertion/Extraction Course
Field Survival Course
Basic CQB Course
Combat Diver Course
Field Training Exercises
SERE

SERE
The final and most infamous course is the SERE training. Over the last few years, the SERE training has been taking part in the Alps of Salzburg. The "run phase" lasts up to ten days, while the candidate must check in at given checkpoints every 24 hours. Considering the mountains in between the points and the tactical need to stay off roads and trails, the candidates are typically very busy meeting their time limits, and they have little time to sleep. Finally, after days on the run and being hunted down by infantry units, helicopters, and K9 units, the candidates are ambushed and captured at one of their checkpoints. This marks the beginning of the "captivity phase". Being the last phase of the selection course, this phase lasts 72 hours (3 days).

Further training
After completing the SERE course, the remaining soldiers (normally 10-15% of all applicants who started the pre selection course) are accepted into the Jagdkommando brotherhood and awarded the "mud-green" beret with the Unit Crest on it. Most of the graduates will be given a slot as active operators in one of the two Task Groups of the unit, while some go back to their regular Army unit.

Jagdkommando soldiers take extreme pride in their long and unique selection course and the prestige that comes along with earning the olive beret inside the armed forces.

If a soldier is chosen to become an operator after selection, he will attend the Einsatzausbildung 1, a course where he will refine his operator skills. The training will last up to one year.

Normally, it starts off with a five-week drivers course, followed by shooting classes. This will be the first time for operators to use the advanced weapon systems Steyr AUG A2 Kdo and the FN P90. After weeks at the shooting range, the next courses will be very mountain orientated, like the mountain airborne course, winter warfare and mountaineering courses, and ski training.

After the mountain courses, the individual job training will begin. Depending on the assignment the operator will attend the Weapon Sergeant Course, Medic Course, Communications Sergeant Course or Engineer Course.

The SOF CQB course that follows teaches the latest techniques in HRO, CC, and DDO. Jagdkommando operators train together with several NATO SOF units worldwide and so the used SOPs and tactics are very similar to other SOF units.

Different other courses will complete the Einsatzausbildung 1, such as the Urban SR course, advanced combatives training, and Air Assault techniques.

After more than 18 months of training the operator will be assigned a team in the 1st SOTG (Special Operations Task Group) or the 2nd SOTG. The 3rd SOTG belongs to the Army Reserve Component. A typical Jagdkommando team consists of six operators: the Team Leader, Team Sergeant, a Weapons Sergeant/Sniper, Engineer Sergeant, Medic Sergeant and Communication Sergeant. Each team is assigned to one insertion speciality, such as freefall, amphibious, mountain, and mobility.

Weapons
 Steyr AUG
 HK416
 HK417P
 FN Herstal P90
 Glock 17 / 18 / 21 / 26
 MG74
 M2 Browning
 Remington 870
 Steyr SSG 69
 Steyr SSG 04
 Steyr SSG 08
 Steyr SSG M1 
 Barrett M82
 Barrett M95

Gallery

See also 
 Austro-Hungarian assault units

References

External links
 Official Site (in German)

Military counterterrorist organizations
Special forces of Austria
Hostage rescue units